Nevşehir Hacı Bektaş Veli University, commonly referred to as Nevşehir University, is a public institute of higher education established in 2007 located in Nevşehir, Turkey.

Affiliations
The university is a member of the Caucasus University Association.

References

Nevşehir
Universities and colleges in Turkey
Buildings and structures in Nevşehir Province
2007 establishments in Turkey
Educational institutions established in 2007